xaitment is a German-based company that develops and sells artificial intelligence (AI) software to video game developers and simulation developers. The company was founded in 2004 by Dr. Andreas Gerber, and is a spin-off of the German Research Centre for Artificial Intelligence, or DFKI. xaitment has its main office in Quierschied, Germany, and field offices in San Francisco and China.

Products 
xaitment currently sells two AI software modules: xaitMap and xaitControl. xaitMap provides runtime libraries and graphical tools for navigation mesh generation (also called NavMesh generation), pathfinding, dynamic collision avoidance, and individual and crowd movement. xaitControl is a finite-state machine for game logic and character behavior modeling that also includes a real-time debugger. On January 11, 2012, xaitment announced that it making its source code for these modules available to "all current and future US and European licensees".

On February 22, 2012 xaitment released two new plug-ins, xaitMap and xaitControl for the Unity Game Engine. 
  
The full versions are available for PC (Windows and Linux), PlayStation 3, Xbox 360 and Wii. The pathfinding plug-in is available with a Windows dev environment, but can deployed on iOS, Mac, Android and the Unity Web Player.

Partners 
xaitment's AI software is currently integrated into the Unity game engine, Havok's Vision Engine, Bohemia Interactive's VBS2 Simulation Engine, GameBase's Gamebryo game engine.

Customers 
xaitment sells its AI software products to video game developers and military and civil simulation developers. Current customers include Tencent, gamania, TML Studios, Emobi Games, IP Keys and others. A full list of customers can be found on xaitment's website.

References

External links 
 xaitment.com

Applications of artificial intelligence
Software companies of Germany